DACS may refer to:

 Data & Analysis Center for Software, United States Department of Defense information analysis center
 De La Rue Automatic Cash System, early ATM
 Describing Archives: A Content Standard, standard for describing collections
 Design and Artists Copyright Society, UK copyright collecting society for visual art
 Digital access and cross-connect system, telecommunications equipment in the United States
 Digital Access Carrier System, telecommunications equipment in the United Kingdom
 Distributed Access Control System, single sign-on and role-based access control system

See also

 DAC (disambiguation)
 
 Daks (disambiguation)
 Dack (disambiguation)